The discography of Brooke Fraser, a singer-songwriter from New Zealand, consists of four studio albums, two compilation albums, nine singles, and nine music videos. The eldest daughter of All Black Bernie Fraser, she was musically active throughout her childhood, and was signed to Sony BMG in 2002. Her first single was "Better", which peaked at number three on the New Zealand Singles Chart. "Better" was included on her first album, What to Do with Daylight, which was released in 2003. Debuting at number one on the New Zealand Albums Chart, the album was eventually certified seven times platinum in New Zealand. As well as "Better", What to Do with Daylight spawned the singles "Lifeline", "Saving the World", "Arithmetic" and "Without You", all of which reached the top 20 of the New Zealand Singles Chart. "Lifeline" also appeared on the Australian Singles Chart, peaking at number fifty-six.

Fraser's second studio effort, Albertine, was released in 2006, and was influenced by and named after a girl she met while on a World Vision visit to Rwanda. It also entered the New Zealand Albums Chart at the top position. It also appeared on the Australian Albums Chart at a high point of number twenty-six, and on the United States' Billboard 200 at number ninety. Albertine was certified four-times platinum in New Zealand, and gold in Australia, and sold over 60,000 copies in North America. Its first two singles, "Deciphering Me" and "Shadowfeet" peaked at number four and thirteen on the New Zealand Singles Chart, respectively. "Shadowfeet" hit number nine on the R&R magazine Christian CHR chart in September 2008, a chart for plays on American Christian music radio stations. The third single, the title track, did not achieve any chart success, however it won her the prestigious APRA Silver Scroll, a songwriting award.

In October 2010, Fraser released her third creation, Flags, which again saw her move to the top of the New Zealand chart. The most successful of her three albums, Flags peaked at number three in Australia, number eighty in Canada, and number fifty-nine in the US. In its first week of release, the album received a gold certification in New Zealand. Flags contained Fraser's first number-one single, "Something in the Water", which proceeded to the top of the New Zealand chart on 18 October 2010, which was the same week that Flags topped the albums chart. This was the first time that a New Zealand artist had a number-one album and single simultaneously since June 2004.

Albums

Studio albums

Live albums

Compilation albums

Singles

Promotional singles

Other charted songs

As lead artist

As featured artist

Music videos

Notes

References

Discographies of New Zealand artists
Pop music discographies
Christian music discographies